"Snap Your Fingers" is a song written by Grady Martin and Alex Zanetis. It was originally recorded by gospel singer Joe Henderson in 1962, whose version peaked at No. 2 on the R&B charts, and at No. 8 on the Hot 100. "Snap Your Fingers" also peaked at No. 5 on the Adult Contemporary chart.

Other versions
Following Henderson's original version, two renditions charted on the Hot Country Songs charts in the 1970s. The first was by Dick Curless, who took a version to number 40 in 1971. Three years later, a rendition by Don Gibson peaked at number 12.

Ronnie Milsap recording

In 1987, Ronnie Milsap's version was his 32nd number one on the country chart as a solo artist. His rendition appears on his 1987 album Heart & Soul.

References

1962 songs
1962 singles
1987 singles
Dick Curless songs
Don Gibson songs
Ronnie Milsap songs
RCA Records singles
Songs written by Alex Zanetis
Songs written by Grady Martin
Song recordings produced by Kyle Lehning